Mason is a city in southwestern Warren County, Ohio, United States, approximately  north of downtown Cincinnati. As of the 2020 census, Mason's population was 34,792.

Mason is home to Kings Island amusement park and one of the largest tennis stadiums in the world, the Lindner Family Tennis Center, home of the Western & Southern Open, one of the world's top tennis tournaments for both men and women.

History
On June 1, 1803, Revolutionary War veteran William Mason paid $1,700 at auction to purchase  of land in what is now downtown Mason. In 1815, he platted 16 lots on this land and named the village "Narnia." In 1832, two years after the death of William Mason, more than 40 additional lots were platted on the north, south, and west of Narnia, according to his will. When the plat was officially recorded, the name of the village was listed as "Palmyra."

In 1835, a petition was sent to the federal post office to correct the name of the town. The town had been listed as Kirkwood, possibly an error because the postmaster at the time was named William Kirkwood. When village officials were informed that there was another Palmyra in Ohio, the name was officially changed to "Mason."

Mason remained a small farming community for another 125 years. In 1970, a year before the town was incorporated to become a city, there were fewer than 5,700 residents.

In February 1997, Mason withdrew from surrounding Deerfield Township by forming a paper township called Mason Township.

On October 25, 2021, Mason City Council passed an ordinance to criminalize abortions within the city limits by a vote of 4 to 3. No abortion providers currently operate within the city limits. The ordinance was later repealed.

Geography

Climate

Demographics

The median income for a household in the city was $89,569, and the median income for a family was $103,459. Males had a median income of $96,002 and females had a median income of $75,968. The per capita income for the city was $37,948. The median house price was $320,289. About 1.6% of families and 2.8% of the population were below the poverty line, including 1.8% of those under age 18 and 4.8% of those age 65 or over.

The city is in the Mason City School District. Mason is served by one interstate, I-71.

2010 census
As of the 2010 census, there were 30,712 residents, 11,016 households, and 8,205 families residing in the city. The racial makeup of the city was 85.1% White, 3.3% African American, 0.2% Native American, 9.0% Asian, 0.1% Pacific Islander, 0.8% from other races, and 1.5% from two or more races. Hispanic or Latino of any race were 3.2% of the population.

There were 11,016 households, of which 44.5% had children under the age of 18 living with them, 63.4% were married couples living together, 8.4% had a female householder with no husband present, 2.7% had a male householder with no wife present, and 25.5% were non-families. 22.4% of all households were made up of individuals, and 8.3% had someone living alone who was 65 years of age or older. The average household size was 2.77 and the average family size was 3.30.

The median age in the city was 38.4 years. 30.8% of residents were under the age of 18; 5.7% were between the ages of 18 and 24; 26.1% were from 25 to 44; 27.4% were from 45 to 64; and 9.9% were 65 years of age or older. The gender makeup of the city was 48.5% male and 51.5% female.

2000 census
As of the 2000 census, there were 22,016 residents, 7,789 households, and 5,981 families residing in the city. The population density was 1,250.0 people per square mile (482.7/km2). There were 8,111 housing units at an average density of 460.5 per square mile (177.8/km2). The racial makeup of the city was 94.79% White, 1.61% African American, 0.19% Native American, 2.18% Asian, 0.01% Pacific Islander, 0.30% from other races, and 0.93% from two or more races. Hispanic or Latino of any race were 0.97% of the population.

There were 7,789 households 45.2% of which had children under the age of 18, 67.5% had married couples living together, 6.8% had a female householder with no husband present, and 23.2% were non-families. 20.0% of all households were made up of individuals, and 6.7% had someone living alone who was 65 years of age or older. The average household size was 2.80 persons and the average family size was 3.27 persons.

In the city, the population was spread out, with 32.1% under the age of 18, 5.1% between 18 and 24, 35.3% between 25 and 44, 19.1% between 45 and 64, and 8.4% over the age of 65. The median age was 34 years. For every 100 females, there were 95.7 males. For every 100 females age 18 and over, there were 92.4 males.

Economy

Mason tourist attractions include Kings Island amusement park and its Soak City water park, Great Wolf Lodge indoor water park and resort, and The Lindner Family Tennis Center, which hosts the historic Western & Southern Open tennis tournament, one of the top nine in the world within the ATP Tour Masters 1000 series.

Mason's largest employers include Procter & Gamble's Mason Business Center, the headquarters of Luxottica Retail and Cintas corporate headquarters. Other notable companies with large operations in Mason are Mitsubishi Electric, L-3 Communications, Heinz., and Prasco Laboratories

Over 500 businesses operate in Mason's 18 square miles. High-tech companies, corporate headquarters, and light industries are particularly attracted to Mason. More than 90 corporations have headquarters or manufacturing operations in Mason's 24 commerce parks.

International Paper Company announced it would close its Mason plant in 2008. In 2015 the site became a branch of Crossroads Church.

Arts and culture
The Mason Veterans Memorial, adjacent to the Mason Municipal Center, was dedicated on Saturday, November 8, 2003. The late Neil Armstrong, a Korean War veteran and the first man to walk on the moon, was the guest of honor. The main feature of the memorial is a set of 10 pillars representing the 10 major conflicts in American history. The height of each pillar is proportional to the number of casualties in the war. The memorial also features an eternal flame.

Mason has a lending library, the Mason Public Library.

Parks and recreation
Mason is home to seven city parks which cover about 300 acres and include fishing lakes, walking trails, ball fields, tennis courts, picnic shelters and playgrounds. The 199,000 square-foot multi-use Mason Community Center, which opened in 2003, is one of the largest public recreation facilities in the state. It has two pools, gymnasium, field house, fitness center, walking track, senior center, exergames, climbing wall, and classroom and meeting areas. A continually expanding network of bike paths connects neighborhoods to schools, parks and downtown.

Government
City council is the legislative body of Mason's city government, and a city manager is appointed by council. Three or four council members are elected in odd-numbered years and serve four-year terms. City government is housed primarily at the Mason Municipal Center, a 120,000 square-foot, two-story facility which opened in fall 2002. Its most distinct feature is a 51-foot-high central atrium. The facility houses Mason Municipal Court, the police and fire departments, a community meeting room and all other city departments except public works and public utilities.

Media 
Mason is part of the Cincinnati media market. Although no broadcast stations are licensed to Mason itself, the city is home to the transmitter site of iHeartMedia, Inc.-owned WLW (AM 700, licensed to Cincinnati), which uses one of only seven remaining Blaw-Knox diamond-shaped towers. WLW was once (1934–1939) the most powerful broadcast station in the country at 500 kilowatts.

Education 
Mason City Schools is consistently rated one of the highest school districts in the state, with a rating of 26 out of 26 indicators on the 2011-2012 Ohio Report Card.

Mason has five public schools: Mason Early Childhood Center (PK-2), Mason Elementary School (grades 3-4), Mason Intermediate School (grades 5-6), Mason Middle School (grades 7-8), and William Mason High School. Mason also has a community center that connected to the high school. The last building to open was the Mason Elementary ("ME") which opened in 2019.

Mason is also home to Sinclair Community College's Courseview Campus, which opened in 2007. The facility is on 75 acres near I-71. As of fall 2013 it has a capacity of 2,500 students and offers 17 degree and 18 certificate programs. In early 2013 Sinclair announced that it expects the Courseview Campus to serve 10,000 students within the next 25 years.

Infrastructure
The Mason Police Department is accredited by the Commission on Accreditation for Law Enforcement Agencies (CALEA). The department employs 39 full-time sworn police officers, including the chief, two assistant chiefs, four lieutenants, and four sergeants. Additionally, the department has seven non-sworn support personnel, including two court security officers. The City of Mason Police Department operates 17 fully equipped marked police cruisers, eight unmarked police cars, and one D.A.R.E. car. In addition, the department operates several special purpose vehicles, including motorcycles, bicycles, and Segways.

The Mason Fire Department has more than 50 fire and emergency medical personnel, including the fire chief, four deputy chiefs, administrative staff, fire inspectors, and full or part-time firefighters. Firefighters are also trained as paramedics or emergency medical technicians (EMT's). The department has two pumpers, one 100-foot ladder truck, one 100-foot tower ladder, one heavy rescue/hazardous materials truck, four paramedic ambulances, one paramedic response car, and additional staff vehicles. These vehicles respond from one of the city's two fire stations.

Notable people
George Clooney, actor
Majel Coleman, actress and model
Brant Daugherty, actor
Josh Kline, National Football League offensive lineman
Dan Patrick, journalist, TV and radio host
T.J. Zeuch, baseball player

References

Further reading
 Elva R. Adams. Warren County Revisited. [Lebanon, Ohio]: Warren County Historical Society, 1989.
 The Centennial Atlas of Warren County, Ohio. Lebanon, Ohio: The Centennial Atlas Association, 1903.
 John W. Hauck. Narrow Gauge in Ohio. Boulder, Colorado: Pruett Publishing, 1986. 
 Josiah Morrow. The History of Warren County, Ohio. Chicago: W.H. Beers, 1883. (Reprinted several times)
 Ohio Atlas & Gazetteer. 6th ed. Yarmouth, Maine: DeLorme, 2001. 
 William E. Smith. History of Southwestern Ohio: The Miami Valleys. New York: Lewis Historical Publishing, 1964. 3 vols.
 Rose Marie Springman. Around Mason, Ohio: A Story. [Mason, Ohio?]: The Author, 1982.
 State of Ohio Mock Trial Organization.  
 Warren County Engineer's Office. Official Highway Map 2003. Lebanon, Ohio: The Office, 2003.

External links

Cities in Warren County, Ohio
Populated places established in 1815
1815 establishments in Ohio
Cities in Ohio